Golden Wind may refer to

Golden Wind (manga), the fifth part of the manga series JoJo's Bizarre Adventure
JoJo's Bizarre Adventure: Golden Wind, an anime adaptation of the manga series
, a Hong Kong cargo ship in service during 1966
The Golden Wind, a historical novel by L. Sprague de Camp, 1969

See also
Golden Wind Zen Order, an American Zen Buddhist Order